Osthe is the soundtrack album for 2011 Tamil film of the same name starring Silambarasan, Richa Gangopadhyay, Sonu Sood, Jithan Ramesh, Santhanam, VTV Ganesh, Nassar and Revathi. Osthe soundtrack album and background score were composed by S. Thaman in his first collaboration with Silambarasan and Dharani, instead of Dharani's usual collaboration with Vidyasagar (who had composed the music for his previous films). Silambarasan said that composer Yuvan Shankar Raja, with whom he usually collaborates, had suggested signing Thaman as music director. The music rights were acquired by Sony Music.

Release
The soundtrack was initially planned to be released on 6 October 2011 (coinciding with Vijayadashami), but the release ceremony was held on 28 October in Chennai. The event was attended by the film's cast and crew, and other celebrities. Vijay, who had worked with Dharani in Ghilli (2004) and Kuruvi (2008), was the guest of honour and unveiled the film's soundtrack CD.

The soundtrack album contains five songs, with lyrics by Vaali and Yugabharathi; Silambarasan wrote the lyrics for "Pondaati". About the song, Silambarasan said that it revolves around a "husband's praise for his wife." "Pondaati" and "Neduvaali" (sung by Rahul Nambiar and Mahathi) are reminiscent of Thaman's compositions for the Telugu film Mirapakaay (2011), and "Kalasala" resembles the song "Munni Badnaam Hui" from Mirapakaay. Although Shruti Haasan was rumoured to have sung "Kalasala", veteran singer L. R. Eswari provided the vocal. Elements of "Kalasala Kalasala" were sampled in "Don't Sell Out" by rapper Tinie Tempah.

Track listing

Reception
The soundtrack received mainly-positive reviews from music critics, and was commercially successful. P. G. Devi of Behindwoods rated the album three out of five and said, "Osthi lives up to its huge expectations with generous mass entertainers like 'Kalasala Kalasala', 'Pondatti' and 'Neduvaali'. It will be a top musical grosser, alluring listeners with its hits". Prakash Upadhyaya of Oneindia.in praised Thaman's musical sense and called the soundtrack "Simbu's Diwali treat". Indiaglitz also gave the soundtrack a positive review: "'Kalasala' the Tamil equivalent of Bollywood chartbuster 'Munni' fulfills all expectations, and even exceeds at some places. If your choice is an album that is a collection of mass numbers, there can't be better pick than Osthi. Go and grab it". Pavithra Srinivasan of Rediff praised the soundtrack's "mildly appealing combination of masala beats", rating it 2.5 out of five.

References

External links
 

Tamil film soundtracks
2011 soundtrack albums
Thaman S albums